The discography of English musician Paul McCartney consists of 26 studio albums, four compilation albums, nine live albums, 37 video albums, two extended plays, 111 singles, seven classical albums, five electronica albums, 17 box sets, and 79 music videos.

Before his career as a solo artist, McCartney enjoyed success as a member of the rock band the Beatles. After their break-up in 1970, McCartney released his eponymous debut album, the 1971 single "Another Day" and Ram with wife Linda McCartney, all of which were commercial successes, with the latter being supported by his first number one single "Uncle Albert/Admiral Halsey". After Ram, the duo formed Wings and released several successful albums including Band on the Run (1973), Venus and Mars, (1975) and Wings at the Speed of Sound (1976). Since the break-up of Wings in 1981, McCartney has continued his career as a solo artist.

In 2012, McCartney was ranked eleventh best selling singles artist in United Kingdom with 10.2 million singles sold.

Albums

Solo and Wings

Classical

Other albums

Live

Compilations

Promotional and limited release

Notes

Box sets

Singles

1970s

1980s

1990s

2000s

2010s

2020s

Promotional and limited release singles

Other charted songs

Videography

Home videos and television specials

Music videos

Soundtracks and other appearances

Collaborations

As composer, invited musician or producer

See also
 The Beatles discography
 Wings discography

Notes

References

Works cited
 

Discographies of British artists
Discography
Pop music discographies
Rock music discographies